Ronald Watts may refer to:

 Ronald Lampman Watts (1929–2015), Canadian academic
 Ronald L. Watts (born 1934), United States Army general